Prater is a 1924 German silent film directed by Peter Paul Felner and starring Henny Porten, Cläre Lotto, and Ossip Runitsch.

The film's art direction was by Otto Erdmann and Hans Sohnle.

Cast

References

Bibliography

External links

1924 films
Films of the Weimar Republic
German silent feature films
Films directed by Peter Paul Felner
German black-and-white films